Textiles is a 2004 French comedy film directed by Franck Landron.

Cast 
 Barbara Schulz - Sophie
 Alexandre Brasseur - Olivier
 Magali Muxart - Juliette
 Simon Bakhouche - Gilbert
 Félix Landron - Nono
 Zoé Landron - Laure
 Angélique Thomas - Adeline
  - Jacky
 Jackie Berroyer - Paul
  - Colette

References

External links 

2004 comedy films
2004 films
French comedy films
2000s French films